Jezreel Vandeh is an Anglican bishop in Nigeria: since 2019 he has been Bishop of Zaki-Biam one of 13 dioceses within the Anglican Province of Abuja, itself one of 14 provinces within the Church of Nigeria.

Notes

Living people
Anglican bishops of Zaki-Biam
21st-century Anglican bishops in Nigeria
Year of birth missing (living people)